Harsh Dubey (born 23 July 2002) is an Indian cricketer. He made his List A debut on 28 February 2021, for Vidarbha in the 2020–21 Vijay Hazare Trophy. He made his Twenty20 debut on 4 November 2021, for Vidarbha in the 2021–22 Syed Mushtaq Ali Trophy.

References

External links
 

2002 births
Living people
Indian cricketers
Vidarbha cricketers
Place of birth missing (living people)